Uttarakhand Gramin Bank is a regional rural bank in India.It is sponsored by State Bank of India established under RRB Act 1976 came into existence on 1 Nov 2012 after amalgamation of erstwhile RRB viz. Uttaranachal Gramin Bank and Nainital Almora Kshetriya Gramin Bank in Uttarakhand State. It is under the ownership of Ministry of Finance , Government of India. The Bank is headquartered at Dehradun and presently its area of operation in all 13 Districts in Uttarakhand having 286 branches, 11 satellite offices, 2 extension counters, and 6 regional offices.

See also

 Banking in India
 List of banks in India
 Reserve Bank of India
 Regional Rural Bank
 Indian Financial System Code
 List of largest banks
 List of companies of India
 Make in India

References

Regional rural banks of India
Companies based in Uttarakhand
2012 establishments in Uttarakhand
Indian companies established in 2012
Banks established in 2012
Dehradun